Once Again is the second studio album by Fusebox. Elevate Records alongside Inpop Records released the album on June 15, 2004.

Critical reception

Giving the album a B at CCM Magazine, David Mackle writes, "this group is proving worthy of independence." Russ Breimeier, signaling in a two and a half star review from Christianity Today, states, "Once Again is not bad, and there may be enough to recommend to those who never get enough of modern worship." Mike Rimmer, rating the album an eight out of ten for Cross Rhythms, says, "Billy has a fine voice, good ideas but still I believe his best work is ahead and I really want Fusebox to take an even edgier turn in order to stand out from the crowd." Josh Taylor, awarding the album three and a half stars at Jesus Freak Hideout, describes, "Once Again is a completely different experience, and well worth a listen." Rating the album a four out of five from The Phantom Tollbooth, Andrew West Griffin states, " a stellar second album called Once Again".

Track listing

References

2004 albums
Inpop Records albums